Game of Thrones: Winter is Coming is a 2019 massively multiplayer online real-time strategy game (MMORTS) developed and published Yoozoo Games. It is based on the television series Game of Thrones.

On 26 March 2019, Yoozoo Games announced the global launch of the game. The version for Steam was released on November 19, 2019, and the mobile port was released on July 20, 2020.

The player takes the part of a lord or lady of one of the seven kingdoms of Westeros, and progresses by training soldiers, recruiting characters and forming an alliance with other players. In the story's timeline, the game starts after Eddard Stark dies, but as if all seven kingdoms had thereupon seceded, not only the North.

Gameplay
Advertisements for this game that intruded into YouTube videos, seemed to say that game activities include not only fighting and war, but also increasing food production (cultivating land, herding sheep, fishing, picking fruit), mining metal ore, having weapons made, felling timber and making buildings, and training men. Picking fruit, cultivating land, fishing and herding sheep are not a part of the actual gameplay.

In the game, a dragon can be obtained, as an egg, which can be hatched, and the hatchling can be raised through its juvenile stage to being big enough to be useful in battle and air-search.

References

External links

2019 video games
Browser games
Video games based on A Song of Ice and Fire
Video games based on television series
Video games based on adaptations
Video games developed in China